is a passenger railway station located in the city of Sakado, Saitama, Japan, operated by the private railway operator Tōbu Railway.

Lines
Rapid Express, Express, Semi express, and all-stations Local services stop at this station.

Station layout
The station consists of a single island platform serving two tracks. The station building is located above the platforms.

Platforms

History
The station opened on 2 April 1979. The name "Wakaba" derived from the nearby Wakabadai housing estate. The station originally had an entrance on the east side only, but was extended in March 2004 with an entrance on the west side leading to a new station forecourt area.

From 17 March 2012, station numbering was introduced on the Tōbu Tōjō Line, with Wakaba Station becoming "TJ-25".

From March 2023, Wakaba Station became a Rapid Express service stop following the abolishment of the Rapid (快速, Kaisoku) services and reorganization of the Tōbu Tōjō Line services.

Passenger statistics
In fiscal 2019, the station was used by an average of 38,038 passengers daily.

Surrounding area

Wakaba Station lies on the boundary between the two cities of Sakado and Tsurugashima.
 Kagawa Nutrition University Sakado Campus
 Yamamura International High School
 University of Tsukuba Senior High School at Sakado
 Wakaba Walk Shopping Centre
 Xien Ten Gong, the largest Taoist temple in Japan
 Fujimi Industrial Estate

Bus services
The north side of the station is served by the "Tsuru Wagon" community minibus service operated by the city of Tsurugashima, and by the "Sakacchi Wagon" (Miyoshino Line) community minibus service operated by the city of Sakado.

See also
 List of railway stations in Japan

References

External links

  

Tobu Tojo Main Line
Stations of Tobu Railway
Railway stations in Saitama Prefecture
Railway stations in Japan opened in 1979
Sakado, Saitama